Chronic obstructive pulmonary disease (COPD) is a type of progressive lung disease characterized by long-term respiratory symptoms and airflow limitation. The main symptoms of COPD include shortness of breath and a cough, which may or may not produce mucus. COPD progressively worsens, with everyday activities such as walking or dressing becoming difficult. While COPD is incurable, it is preventable and treatable.

The two most common conditions of COPD are emphysema and chronic bronchitis and they have been the two classic COPD phenotypes. Emphysema is defined as enlarged airspaces (alveoli) whose walls have broken down resulting in permanent damage to the lung tissue. Chronic bronchitis is defined as a productive cough that is present for at least three months each year for two years. Both of these conditions can exist without airflow limitation when they are not classed as COPD. Emphysema is just one of the structural abnormalities that can limit airflow and can exist without airflow limitation in a significant number of people. Chronic bronchitis does not always result in airflow limitation but in young adults who smoke the risk of developing COPD is high. Many definitions of COPD in the past included emphysema and chronic bronchitis, but these have never been included in GOLD report definitions. Emphysema and chronic bronchitis remain the predominant phenotypes of COPD but there is often overlap between them and a number of other phenotypes have also been described. COPD and asthma may coexist and converge in some individuals. COPD is associated with low-grade systemic inflammation.

The most common cause of COPD is tobacco smoking. Other risk factors include indoor and outdoor air pollution including dust, exposure to occupational irritants such as dust from grains, cadmium dust or fumes, and genetics, such as alpha-1 antitrypsin deficiency. In developing countries, common sources of indoor air pollution are the use of coal and biomass such as wood and dry dung as fuel for cooking and heating. Most people living in European cities are exposed to damaging levels of air pollution. The diagnosis is based on poor airflow as measured by spirometry.

Most cases of COPD can be prevented by reducing exposure to risk factors such as smoking and indoor and outdoor pollutants. While treatment can slow worsening, there is no conclusive evidence that any medications can change the long-term decline in lung function. COPD treatments include smoking cessation, vaccinations, pulmonary rehabilitation, inhaled bronchodilators and corticosteroids. Some people may benefit from long-term oxygen therapy, lung volume reduction and lung transplantation. In those who have periods of acute worsening, increased use of medications, antibiotics, corticosteroids and hospitalization may be needed.

As of 2015, COPD affected about 174.5 million people (2.4% of the global population). It typically occurs in males and females over the age of 35–40. In 2019 it caused 3.2 million deaths, 80% occurring in lower and middle income countries, up from 2.4 million deaths in 1990. The number of deaths is projected to increase further because of continued exposure to risk factors and an aging population. In the United States in 2010 the economic cost was put at US$32.1 billion and projected to rise to US$49 billion in 2020. In the United Kingdom this cost is estimated at £3.8 billion annually.

Signs and symptoms

Shortness of breath 
A cardinal symptom of COPD is the chronic and progressive shortness of breath which is most characteristic of the condition. Shortness of breath (breathlessness) is often the most distressing symptom responsible for the associated anxiety and level of disability experienced. Symptoms of wheezing and chest tightness associated with breathlessness can be variable over the course of a day or between days and are not always present. Chest tightness often follows exertion. Many people with more advanced COPD breathe through pursed lips, which can improve shortness of breath. Shortness of breath is often responsible for reduced physical activity and low levels of physical activity are associated with worse outcomes. In severe and very severe cases there may be constant tiredness, weight loss, muscle loss and anorexia. People with COPD often have increased breathlessness and frequent colds before seeking treatment.

Cough 
The most often first symptom of COPD is a chronic cough, which may or may not be productive of mucus as phlegm. Phlegm coughed up as sputum can be intermittent and may be swallowed or spat out depending on social or cultural factors and is therefore not always easy to evaluate. However, an accompanying productive cough is only seen in up to 30% of cases. Sometimes limited airflow may develop in the absence of a cough. Symptoms are usually worse in the morning.

A chronic productive cough is the result of mucus hypersecretion and when it persists for more than three months each year for at least two years, it is defined as chronic bronchitis. Chronic bronchitis can occur before the restricted airflow diagnostic of COPD. Some people with COPD attribute the symptoms to the consequences of smoking. In severe COPD, vigorous coughing may lead to rib fractures or to a brief loss of consciousness.

Exacerbations 
An acute exacerbation is a sudden worsening of signs and symptoms that lasts for several days. The key symptom is increased breathlessness, other more pronounced symptoms are of excessive mucus, increased cough and wheeze. A commonly found sign is air trapping giving a difficulty in complete exhalation.
The usual cause of an exacerbation is a viral infection, most often the common cold. The common cold is usually associated with the winter months but can occur at any time. Other respiratory infections may be bacterial or in combination sometimes secondary to a viral infection. The most common bacterial infection is caused by Haemophilus influenzae. Other risks include exposure to tobacco smoke (active and passive) and environmental pollutantsboth indoor and outdoor. During the COVID-19 pandemic, hospital admissions for COPD exacerbations sharply decreased which may be attributable to reduction of emissions and cleaner air. There has also been a marked decrease in the number of cold and flu infections during this time.

Smoke from wildfires is proving an increasing risk in many parts of the world and government agencies have published protective advice on their websites. In the US the EPA advises that the use of dust masks do not give protection from the fine particles in wildfires and instead advise the use of well-fitting particulate masks. This same advice is offered in Canada to the effects of their forest fires. Bushfires in Australia add to the high risk factors for COPD and its worsening for farmers.

The number of exacerbations is not seen to relate to any stage of the disease; those with two or more a year are classed as frequent exacerbators and these lead to a worsening in the disease progression. Frailty in ageing increases exacerbations and hospitalization.

Acute exacerbations in COPD are often unexplained and thought to have many causes other than infections.  A study has emphasized the possibility of a pulmonary embolism as sometimes being responsible in these cases. Signs can include pleuritic chest pain and heart failure without signs of infection. Such emboli could respond to anticoagulants.

Other conditions 
COPD often occurs along with a number of other conditions (comorbidities) due in part to shared risk factors. Common comorbidities include cardiovascular disease, skeletal muscle dysfunction, metabolic syndrome, osteoporosis, depression, anxiety, asthma and lung cancer. Alpha-1 antitrypsin deficiency (A1AD) is an important risk factor for COPD. It is advised that everybody with COPD be screened for A1AD. Metabolic syndrome has been seen to affect up to fifty percent of those with COPD and significantly affects the outcomes. When comorbid with COPD there is more systemic inflammation. It is not known if it co-exists with COPD or develops as a consequence of the pathology. Metabolic syndrome on its own has a high rate of morbidity and mortality and this rate is amplified when comorbid with COPD. Tuberculosis is a risk factor for the development of COPD, and is also a potential comorbidity. Most people with COPD die from comorbidities and not from respiratory problems.

Anxiety and depression are often complications of COPD. Other complications include a reduced quality of life and increased disability, cor pulmonale, frequent chest infections including pneumonia, secondary polycythemia, respiratory failure, pneumothorax, lung cancer, and cachexia (muscle wasting).

Cognitive impairment is common in those with COPD as it is for other lung conditions that affect airflow. Cognitive impairment is associated with the declining ability to cope with the basic activities of daily living.

It is unclear if those with COPD are at greater risk of contracting COVID-19, though if infected they are at risk of hospitalization and developing severe COVID-19.
Differentiating COVID-19 symptoms from an exacerbation is difficult; mild prodromal symptoms may delay its recognition and where they include loss of taste or smell COVID-19 is to be suspected.

Definition
Many definitions of COPD in the past included chronic bronchitis and emphysema but these have never been included in GOLD report definitions. Emphysema is defined as enlarged airspaces (alveoli) whose walls break down resulting in permanent damage to the lung tissue and is just one of the structural abnormalities that can limit airflow. The condition can exist without airflow limitation but commonly it does. Chronic bronchitis is defined as a productive cough that is present for at least three months each year for two years but does not always result in airflow limitation although the risk of developing COPD is great. These older definitions grouped the two types as type A and type B. Type A were emphysema types known as pink puffers due to their pink complexion, fast breathing rate and pursed lips. Type B were chronic bronchitic types referred to as blue bloaters due to low oxygen levels causing a bluish color to the skin and lips and swollen ankles. These differences were suggested to be due to the presence or not of collateral ventilation, evident in emphysema and lacking in chronic bronchitis. This terminology was no longer accepted as useful, as most people with COPD have a combination of both emphysema and airway disease. These are now recognized as the two major phenotypes of COPD – emphysematous phenotype and chronic bronchitic phenotype.

Subtypes 
It has since been recognized that COPD is more complex, with a diverse group of disorders of differing risk factors and clinical courses that has resulted in a number of subtypes or phenotypes of COPD being accepted and proposed. The two classic emphysematous and chronic bronchitic phenotypes are fundamentally different conditions with unique underlying mechanisms. Another subtype of COPD, categorized by some as a separate clinical entity, is asthma-COPD overlap, which is a condition sharing clinical features of both asthma and COPD. Spirometry measures are inadequate for defining phenotypes and chest X-ray, CT and MRI scans have been mostly employed. Most cases of COPD are diagnosed at a late stage and the use of imaging methods would allow earlier detection and treatment.

The identification and recognition of different phenotypes can guide appropriate treatment approaches. For example, the PDE4 inhibitor roflumilast is targeted at the chronic-bronchitic phenotype.

Two inflammatory phenotypes show a phenotype stability: the neutrophilic inflammatory phenotype and the eosinophilic inflammatory phenotype. Mepolizumab, a monoclonal antibody, has been shown to have benefit in treating the eosinophilic inflammatory type rather than the use of oral corticosteroids, but further studies have been called for.

Another recognized phenotype is the frequent exacerbator. The frequent exacerbator has two or more exacerbations a year, has a poor prognosis and is described as a moderately stable phenotype.

A pulmonary vascular COPD phenotype has been described due to cardiovascular dysfunction. A molecular phenotype of CFTR dysfunction is shared with cystic fibrosis. A combined phenotype of chronic bronchitis and bronchiectasis has been described with a difficulty noted of determining the best treatment.

The only genotype is the alpha-1 antitrypsin deficiency (AATD) genetic subtype and this has a specific treatment.

Cause
The cause of the development of COPD is the exposure to harmful particles or gases, including tobacco smoke, that irritate the lung causing inflammation that interacts with a number of host factors. Such exposure needs to be significant or long-term. The greatest risk factor for the development of COPD is tobacco smoke. However, less than 50 percent of heavy smokers develop COPD, so other factors need to be considered, including exposure to indoor and outdoor pollutants, allergens, occupational exposure, and host factors. One of the known causes of COPD is the exposure to construction dust. The three main types of construction dust includes silica dust, non-silica dust (e.g, dust from gypsum, cement, limestone, marble and dolomite) and wood dust. Host factors include a genetic susceptibility, factors associated with poverty, aging and physical inactivity. Asthma and tuberculosis are also recognized as risk factors, as the cormorbidity of COPD is reported to be 12 times higher in patients with asthma after adjusting for smoking history. In Europe airway hyperresponsiveness is rated as the second most important risk factor after smoking.

A host factor of an airway branching variation, arising during development has been described. The respiratory tree is a filter for harmful substances and any variant has the potential to disrupt this. A variation has been found to be associated with the development of chronic bronchitis and another with the development of emphysema. A branch variant in the central airway is specifically associated with an increased susceptibility for the later development of COPD. A genetic association for the variants has been sometimes found with FGF10.

Alcohol abuse can lead to alcoholic lung disease and is seen to be an independent risk factor for COPD.
Mucociliary clearance is disrupted by chronic exposure to alcohol; macrophage activity is diminished and an inflammatory response promoted. The damage leads to a susceptibility for infection, including COVID-19, more so when combined with smoking; smoking induces the upregulation of the expression of ACE2, a receptor for the SARS-CoV-2 virus.

Smoking
The primary risk factor for COPD globally is tobacco smoking with an increased rate of developing COPD shown in smokers and ex-smokers. Of those who smoke, about 20% will get COPD, increasing to less than 50% in heavy smokers. In the United States and United Kingdom, of those with COPD, 80–95% are either current or previous smokers. Several studies indicate that women are more susceptible than men to the harmful effects of tobacco smoke. For the same amount of cigarette smoking, women have a higher risk of COPD than men. In non-smokers, exposure to second-hand smoke (passive smoking) is the cause of 1.2 million deaths from the more than 8 million deaths worldwide each year due to tobacco smoke. Women who smoke during pregnancy, and during the early life of the child is a risk factor for the later development of COPD in their child.

Inhaled smoke triggers the release of excessive proteases in lungs, which then degrades elastin, the major component of alveoli (which allows rapid gas exchange in the lungs). Smoke also impairs the action of cilia, inhibiting mucociliary clearance that clears the bronchi of mucus, cellular debris and unwanted fluid.

Other types of tobacco smoke, such as from cigar, pipe, water-pipe and hookah use, also confer a risk. Water-pipe or hookah smoke appears to be as harmful or even more harmful than smoking cigarettes.

Marijuana is the second most commonly smoked substance, but evidence linking its use to COPD is very limited. Limited evidence shows that marijuana does not accelerate lung function decline. A low use of marijuana gives a bronchodilatory effect rather than the bronchoconstrictive effect from tobacco use, but it is often smoked in combination with tobacco or on its own by tobacco smokers. Higher use however has shown a decline in the FEV1. There is evidence of it causing some respiratory problems and its use in combination may have a cumulative toxic effect suggesting it as a risk factor for spontaneous pneumothorax, bullous emphysema, COPD and lung cancer. A noted difference between marijuana use and tobacco was that respiratory problems were resolved with stopping usage unlike the continued decline with stopping tobacco smoking. Respiratory symptoms reported with marijuana use included chronic cough, increased sputum production and wheezing but not shortness of breath. Also these symptoms were typically reported ten years ahead of their affecting tobacco smokers. Another study found that chronic marijuana smokers even with the additional use of tobacco developed similar respiratory problems, but did not seem to develop airflow limitation and COPD.

Pollution

Exposure to particulates can bring about the development of COPD, or its exacerbations. Those with COPD are more susceptible to the harmful effects of particulate exposure that can cause acute exacerbations brought about by infections. Black carbon also known as soot, is an air pollutant associated with an increased risk of hospitalization due to the exacerbations caused. Long-term exposure is indicated as an increased rate of mortality in COPD. Studies have shown that people who live in large cities have a higher rate of COPD compared to people who live in rural areas. Areas with poor outdoor air quality, including that from exhaust gas, generally have higher rates of COPD.  Urban air pollution significantly effects the developing lung and its maturation, and contributes a potential risk factor for the later development of COPD. The overall effect in relation to smoking, is believed to be small.

Poorly ventilated fires used for cooking and heating, are often fueled by coal or biomass such as wood and dry dung, leading to indoor air pollution and are one of the most common causes of COPD in developing countries. Women are affected more as they have a greater exposure. These fuels are used as the main source of energy in 80% of homes in India, China and sub-Saharan Africa.

Occupational exposure

Intense and prolonged exposure to workplace dusts, chemicals and fumes increases the risk of COPD in smokers, nonsmokers and never-smokers. Substances implicated in occupational exposure and listed in the UK, include organic and inorganic dusts such as cadmium, silica, dust from grains and flour and fumes from cadmium and welding that promote respiratory symptoms. Workplace exposure is believed to be the cause in 10–20% of cases and in the United States, it is believed to be related to around 30% of cases among never smokers and probably represents a greater risk in countries without sufficient regulations. The negative effects of dust exposure and cigarette smoke exposure appear to be cumulative.

Genetics
Genetics play a role in the development of COPD. It is more common among relatives of those with COPD who smoke than unrelated smokers. The most well known genetic risk factor is alpha-1 antitrypsin deficiency (AATD) and this is the only genotype (genetic subtype) with a specific treatment. This risk is particularly high if someone deficient in alpha-1 antitrypsin (AAT) also smokes. It is responsible for about 1–5% of cases and the condition is present in about three to four in 10,000 people.

Mutations in MMP1 gene that encodes for interstitial collagenase are associated with COPD.

The COPDGene study is an ongoing longitudinal study into the epidemiology of COPD, identifying phenotypes and looking for their likely association with susceptible genes. Genome wide analyses in concert with the International COPD Genetics Consortium has identified more than 80 genome regions associated with COPD and further studies in these regions has been called for. Whole genome sequencing is an ongoing
collaboration (2019) with the National Heart, Lung and Blood Institute (NHLBI) to identify rare genetic determinants.

Pathophysiology

COPD is a progressive lung disease in which chronic, incompletely reversible poor airflow (airflow limitation) and an inability to breathe out fully (air trapping) exist. The poor airflow is the result of small airways disease and emphysema (the breakdown of lung tissue). The relative contributions of these two factors vary between people. Air trapping precedes lung hyperinflation.

COPD develops as a significant and chronic inflammatory response to inhaled irritants which ultimately leads to bronchial and alveolar remodelling in the lung known as small airways disease. Thus, airway remodelling with narrowing of peripheral airway and emphysema are responsible for the alteration of lung function. Mucociliary clearance is particularly altered with a dysregulation of cilia and mucus production. Small airway disease sometimes called chronic bronchiolitis, appears to be the precursor for the development of emphysema.
The inflammatory cells involved include neutrophils and macrophages, two types of white blood cells. Those who smoke additionally have cytotoxic T cell involvement and some people with COPD have eosinophil involvement similar to that in asthma. Part of this cell response is brought on by inflammatory mediators such as chemotactic factors. Other processes involved with lung damage include oxidative stress produced by high concentrations of free radicals in tobacco smoke and released by inflammatory cells and breakdown of the connective tissue of the lungs by proteases (particularly elastase) that are insufficiently inhibited by protease inhibitors. The destruction of the connective tissue of the lungs leads to emphysema, which then contributes to the poor airflow and finally, poor absorption and release of respiratory gases. General muscle wasting that often occurs in COPD may be partly due to inflammatory mediators released by the lungs into the blood.

Narrowing of the airways occurs due to inflammation and subsequent scarring within them. This contributes to the inability to breathe out fully. The greatest reduction in air flow occurs when breathing out, as the pressure in the chest is compressing the airways at this time. This can result in more air from the previous breath remaining within the lungs when the next breath is started, resulting in an increase in the total volume of air in the lungs at any given time, a process called air trapping which is closely followed by hyperinflation. Hyperinflation from exercise is linked to shortness of breath in COPD, as breathing in is less comfortable when the lungs are already partly filled. Hyperinflation may also worsen during an exacerbation. There may also be a degree of airway hyperresponsiveness to irritants similar to those found in asthma.

Low oxygen levels and eventually, high carbon dioxide levels in the blood, can occur from poor gas exchange due to decreased ventilation from airway obstruction, hyperinflation and a reduced desire to breathe. During exacerbations, airway inflammation is also increased, resulting in increased hyperinflation, reduced expiratory airflow and worsening of gas transfer. This can lead to low blood oxygen levels which if present for a prolonged period, can result in narrowing of the arteries in the lungs, while emphysema leads to the breakdown of capillaries in the lungs. Both of these conditions may result in pulmonary heart disease also classically known as cor pulmonale.

Diagnosis 

The diagnosis of COPD should be considered in anyone over the age of 35 to 40 who has shortness of breath, a chronic cough, sputum production, or frequent winter colds and a history of exposure to risk factors for the disease. Spirometry is then used to confirm the diagnosis.

Spirometry
Spirometry measures the amount of airflow obstruction present and is generally carried out after the use of a bronchodilator, a medication to open up the airways. Two main components are measured to make the diagnosis, the forced expiratory volume in one second (FEV1), which is the greatest volume of air that can be breathed out in the first second of a breath and the forced vital capacity (FVC), which is the greatest volume of air that can be breathed out in a single large breath. Normally, 75–80% of the FVC comes out in the first second and a FEV1/FVC ratio less than 70% in someone with symptoms of COPD defines a person as having the disease. Based on these measurements, spirometry would lead to over-diagnosis of COPD in the elderly. The National Institute for Health and Care Excellence criteria additionally require a FEV1 less than 80% of predicted. People with COPD also exhibit a decrease in diffusing capacity of the lung for carbon monoxide due to decreased surface area in the alveoli, as well as damage to the capillary bed. Testing the peak expiratory flow (the maximum speed of expiration), commonly used in asthma diagnosis, is not sufficient for the diagnosis of COPD.

Screening using spirometry in those without symptoms has uncertain effect and is generally not recommended; however, it is recommended for those without symptoms but with a known risk factor.

Assessment

A number of methods can be used to assess the affects and severity of COPD. The MRC breathlessness scale or the COPD assessment test (CAT) are simple questionnaires that may be used. GOLD refers to a modified MRC scale that if used, needs to include other tests since it is simply a test of breathlessness experienced. Scores on CAT range from 0–40 with the higher the score, the more severe the disease. Spirometry may help to determine the severity of airflow limitation. This is typically based on the FEV1 expressed as a percentage of the predicted "normal" for the person's age, gender, height and weight. Guidelines published in 2011 by American and European medical societies recommend partly basing treatment recommendations on the FEV1. The GOLD guidelines group people into four categories based on symptoms assessment, degree of airflow limitation and history of exacerbations. Weight loss, muscle loss and fatigue are seen in severe and very severe cases.

Use of screening questionnaires, such as COPD diagnostic questionnaire (CDQ), alone or in combination with hand-held flow meters is appropriate for screening of COPD in primary care.

Other tests
A chest X-ray is not useful to establish a diagnosis of COPD but it is of use in either excluding other conditions or including comorbidities such as pulmonary fibrosis and bronchiectasis. Characteristic signs of COPD on X-ray include hyperinflation (shown by a flattened diaphragm and an increased retrosternal air space) and lung hyperlucency. A saber-sheath trachea may also be shown that is indicative of COPD.

A CT scan is not routinely used except for the exclusion of bronchiectasis. An analysis of arterial blood is used to determine the need for oxygen supplementation and assess for high levels of carbon dioxide in the blood; this is recommended in those with an FEV1 less than 35% predicted, those with a peripheral oxygen saturation less than 92% and those with symptoms of congestive heart failure. WHO recommends that all those diagnosed with COPD be screened for alpha-1 antitrypsin deficiency.

Differential diagnosis
COPD may need to be differentiated from other conditions such as congestive heart failure, asthma, bronchiectasis, tuberculosis, obliterative bronchiolitis and diffuse panbronchiolitis. The distinction between asthma and COPD is made on the basis of the symptoms, smoking history and whether airflow limitation is reversible with bronchodilators at spirometry. Chronic bronchitis with normal airflow is not classified as COPD.

Prevention
Most cases of COPD are potentially preventable through decreasing exposure to tobacco smoke and other indoor and outdoor pollutants.

Smoking cessation
 

The policies of governments, public health agencies and antismoking organizations can reduce smoking rates by discouraging people from starting and encouraging people to stop smoking. Smoking bans in public areas and places of work are important measures to decrease exposure to secondhand smoke and while many places have instituted bans, more are recommended.

In those who smoke, stopping smoking is the only measure shown to slow down the worsening of COPD. Even at a late stage of the disease, it can reduce the rate of worsening lung function and delay the onset of disability and death. Often, several attempts are required before long-term abstinence is achieved. Attempts over 5 years lead to success in nearly 40% of people.

Some smokers can achieve long-term smoking cessation through willpower alone. Smoking, however, is highly addictive and many smokers need further support. The chance of quitting is improved with social support, engagement in a smoking cessation program and the use of medications such as nicotine replacement therapy, bupropion, or varenicline. Combining smoking-cessation medication with behavioral therapy is more than twice as likely to be effective in helping people with COPD stop smoking, compared with behavioral therapy alone.

Occupational health
A number of measures have been taken to reduce the likelihood that workers in at-risk industries—such as coal mining, construction and stonemasonry—will develop COPD. Examples of these measures include the creation of public policy, education of workers and management about the risks, promoting smoking cessation, checking workers for early signs of COPD, use of respirators and dust control. Effective dust control can be achieved by improving ventilation, using water sprays and by using mining techniques that minimize dust generation. If a worker develops COPD, further lung damage can be reduced by avoiding ongoing dust exposure, for example by changing their work role.

Pollution control

Both indoor and outdoor air quality can be improved, which may prevent COPD or slow the worsening of existing disease. This may be achieved by public policy efforts, cultural changes and personal involvement. Many developed countries have successfully improved outdoor air quality through regulations which has resulted in improvements in the lung function of their populations. Individuals are also advised to avoid irritants of indoor and outdoor pollution.

In developing countries one key effort is to reduce exposure to smoke from cooking and heating fuels through improved ventilation of homes and better stoves and chimneys. Proper stoves may improve indoor air quality by 85%. Using alternative energy sources such as solar cooking and electrical heating is also effective. Using fuels such as kerosene or coal might produce less household particulate matter than traditional biomass such as wood or dung, but whether this is better health wise is unclear.

Management 
COPD is not curable, but the symptoms are treatable and its progression can be delayed, particularly by stopping smoking. The major goals of management are to reduce exposure to risk factors including offering non-pharmacological treatments such as help with stopping smoking. Stopping smoking can reduce the rate of lung function decline and also reduce mortality from smoking-related diseases such as lung cancer and cardiovascular disease. Other recommendations include annual influenza vaccinations and pneumococcal vaccination to help reduce the risk of exacerbations; giving advice as to healthy eating and encouraging physical exercise. Guidance is also advised as to managing breathlessness and stress.

Other illnesses are also managed. An action plan is drawn up and is to be reviewed. Providing people with a personalized action plan, an educational session and support for use of their action plan in the event of an exacerbation, reduces the number of hospital visits and encourages early treatment of exacerbations. When self-management interventions, such as taking corticosteroids and using supplemental oxygen, is combined with action plans, health-related quality of life is improved compared to usual care. In those with COPD who are malnourished, supplementation with vitamin C, vitamin E, zinc and selenium can improve weight, strength of respiratory muscles and health-related quality of life. Significant vitamin D deficiency is common in those with COPD and can cause increased exacerbations. Supplementation when deficient can give a 50% reduction in the number of exacerbations.

A number of medical treatments are used in the management of stable COPD and exacerbations. These include bronchodilators, corticosteroids and antibiotics.

In those with a severe exacerbation, antibiotics improve outcomes. A number of different antibiotics may be used including amoxicillin, doxycycline and azithromycin; whether one is better than the others is unclear. There is no clear evidence of improved outcomes for those with less severe cases. The FDA recommends against the use of fluoroquinolones when other options are available due to higher risks of serious side effects.
In treating acute hypercapnic respiratory failure (acutely raised levels of carbon dioxide), bilevel positive airway pressure (BPAP) can decrease mortality and the need of intensive care. Fewer than 20% of exacerbations require hospital admission. In those without acidosis from respiratory failure, home care may be able to help avoid some admissions.

In those with end-stage disease, palliative care is focused on relieving symptoms. Morphine can improve exercise tolerance. Non-invasive ventilation may be used to support breathing and also reduce daytime breathlessness.

Bronchodilators
Inhaled short-acting bronchodilators are the primary medications used on an as needed basis; their use on a regular basis is not recommended. The two major types are beta2-adrenergic agonists and anticholinergics; either in long-acting or short-acting forms. Beta2–adrenergic agonists target receptors in the smooth muscle cells in bronchioles causing them to relax and allow improved airflow. They reduce shortness of breath, tend to reduce dynamic hyperinflation and improve exercise tolerance. Short-acting bronchodilators have an effect for four hours and for maintenance therapy long acting bronchodilators with an effect of over twelve hours are used. In times of more severe symptoms a short acting agent may be used in combination. An inhaled corticosteroid used with a long-acting beta-2 agonist is more effective than either one on its own.

Which type of long-acting agent, long-acting muscarinic antagonist (LAMA) such as tiotropium or a long-acting beta agonist (LABA) is better is unclear and trying each and continuing with the one that works best may be advisable. Both types of agent appear to reduce the risk of acute exacerbations by 15–25%. The combination of LABA/LAMA may reduce COPD exacerbations and improve quality-of-life compared to long-acting bronchodilators alone. The 2018 NICE guideline recommends use of dual long-acting bronchodilators with economic modelling suggesting that this approach is preferable to starting one long acting bronchodilator and adding another later.

Several short-acting β2 agonists are available, including salbutamol (albuterol) and terbutaline. They provide some relief of symptoms for four to six hours. LABAs such as salmeterol, formoterol and indacaterol are often used as maintenance therapy. Some feel the evidence of benefits is limited, while others view the evidence of benefit as established. Long-term use appears safe in COPD with adverse effects include shakiness and heart palpitations. When used with inhaled steroids they increase the risk of pneumonia. While steroids and LABAs may work better together, it is unclear if this slight benefit outweighs the increased risks. There is some evidence that combined treatment of LABAs with long-acting muscarinic antagonists (LAMA), an anticholinergic, may result in less exacerbations, less pneumonia, an improvement in forced expiratory volume (FEV1%) and potential improvements in quality of life when compared to treatment with LABA and an inhaled corticosteriod (ICS). All three together, LABA, LAMA and ICS, have some evidence of benefits. Indacaterol requires an inhaled dose once a day and is as effective as the other long-acting β2 agonist drugs that require twice-daily dosing for people with stable COPD.

The two main anticholinergics used in COPD are ipratropium and tiotropium. Ipratropium is a short-acting muscarinic antagonist (SAMA), while tiotropium is long-acting. Tiotropium is associated with a decrease in exacerbations and improved quality of life, and tiotropium provides those benefits better than ipratropium. It does not appear to affect mortality or the overall hospitalization rate. Anticholinergics can cause dry mouth and urinary tract symptoms. They are also associated with increased risk of heart disease and stroke. Aclidinium, another long-acting agent, reduces hospitalizations associated with COPD and improves quality of life. The LAMA umeclidinium bromide is another anticholinergic alternative. When compared to tiotropium, the LAMAs aclidinium, glycopyrronium and umeclidinium appear to have a similar level of efficacy; with all four being more effective than placebo. Further research is needed comparing aclidinium to tiotropium.

Corticosteroids
Inhaled corticosteroids are anti-inflammatories that are recommended by GOLD as a first-line maintenance treatment in COPD cases with repeated exacerbations. Their regular use increases the risk of pneumonia in severe cases. Studies have shown that the risk of pneumonia is associated with all types of corticosteroids; is related to the disease severity and a dose-response relationship has been noted. Oral glucocorticoids can be effective in treating an acute exacerbation. They appear to have fewer side effects than those given intravenously. Five days of steroids work as well as ten or fourteen days.

The use of corticosteroids is associated with a decrease in the number of lymphoid follicles (in the bronchial lymphoid tissue). A triple inhaled therapy of LABA/LAMA/ICS improves lung function, reduces symptoms and exacerbations and is seen to be more effective than mono or dual therapies. NICE guidelines recommend the use of ICSs in people with asthmatic features or features suggesting steroid responsiveness.

PDE4 inhibitors
Phosphodiesterase-4 inhibitors (PDE4 inhibitors) are anti-inflammatories that improve lung function and reduce exacerbations in moderate to severe illness. Roflumilast is a PDE4 inhibitor used orally once daily to reduce inflammation, it has no direct bronchodilatory effects. It is essentially used in treating those with chronic bronchitis along with systemic corticosteroids. Reported adverse effects of roflumilast appear early in treatment, become less with continued treatment and are reversible. One effect is dramatic weight loss and its use is to be avoided in underweight people. It is also advised to be used with caution in those who have depression.

Other medications
Long-term preventive use of antibiotics, specifically those from the macrolide class such as erythromycin, reduce the frequency of exacerbations in those who have two or more a year. This practice may be cost effective in some areas of the world. Concerns include the potential for antibiotic resistance and side effects including hearing loss, tinnitus and changes to the heart rhythm known as long QT syndrome.

Methylxanthines such as theophylline are widely used. Theophylline is seen to have a mild bronchodilatory effect in stable COPD. Inspiratory muscle function is seen to be improved but the causal effect is unclear. Theophylline is seen to improve breathlessness when used as an add-on to salmeterol. All instances of improvement have been reported using sustained release preparations. Methylxanthines are not recommended for use in exacerbations due to adverse effects.

Mucolytics may help to reduce exacerbations in some people with chronic bronchitis; noticed by less hospitalization and less days of disability in one month. Erdosteine is recommended by NICE. GOLD also supports the use of some mucolytics that are advised against when inhaled corticosteroids are being used and singles out erdosteine as having good effects regardless of corticosteroid use. Erdosteine also has antioxidant properties but there is not enough evidence to support the general use of antioxidants. Erdosteine has been shown to significantly reduce the risk of exacerbations, shorten their duration and hospital stays.

Cough medicines are not recommended. Beta blockers are not contraindicated for those with COPD and should only be used where there is concomitant cardiovascular disease.

Recent studies show that metformin plays a role in reducing systemic inflammation by reducing biomarker levels that are increased during COPD exacerbations.

Oxygen therapy

Supplemental oxygen is recommended for those with low oxygen levels in respiratory failure at rest (a partial pressure of oxygen less than 50–55 mmHg or oxygen saturations of less than 88%). When taking into account complications including cor pulmonale and pulmonary hypertension, the levels involved are 56–59 mmHg. Oxygen therapy is to be used for between 15 and 18 hours per day and is said to decrease the risk of heart failure and death. In those with normal or mildly low oxygen levels, oxygen supplementation (ambulatory) may improve shortness of breath when given during exercise, but may not improve breathlessness during normal daily activities or affect the quality of life. During acute exacerbations, many require oxygen therapy; the use of high concentrations of oxygen without taking into account a person's oxygen saturations may lead to increased levels of carbon dioxide and worsened outcomes. In those at high risk of high carbon dioxide levels, oxygen saturations of 88–92% are recommended, while for those without this risk, recommended levels are 94–98%.

Rehabilitation 
Pulmonary rehabilitation is a program of exercise, disease management and counseling, coordinated to benefit the individual. A severe exacerbertion leads to hospital admission, high mortality and a decline in the ability to carry out daily activities. Following a hospital admission pulmonary rehabilitation has been shown to significantly reduce future hospital admissions, mortality and improve quality of life.

The optimal exercise routine, use of noninvasive ventilation during exercise and intensity of exercise suggested for people with COPD, is unknown. Performing endurance arm exercises improves arm movement for people with COPD and may result in a small improvement in breathlessness. Performing arm exercises alone does not appear to improve quality of life. Pursed-lip breathing exercises may be useful. Tai chi exercises appear to be safe to practice for people with COPD and may be beneficial for pulmonary function and pulmonary capacity when compared to a regular treatment program. Tai Chi was not found to be more effective than other exercise intervention programs. Inspiratory and expiratory muscle training (IMT, EMT) is an effective method for improving activities of daily living (ADL). A combination of IMT and walking exercises at home may help limit breathlessness in cases of severe COPD. Additionally, the use of low amplitude high velocity joint mobilization together with exercise improves lung function and exercise capacity. The goal of spinal manipulation therapy is to improve thoracic mobility in an effort to reduce the work on the lungs during respiration, however, the evidence supporting manual therapy for people with COPD is very weak.

Airway clearance techniques (ACTs), such as postural drainage, percussion/vibration, autogenic drainage, hand-held positive expiratory pressure (PEP) devices and other mechanical devices, may reduce the need for increased ventilatory assistance, the duration of ventilatory assistance and the length of hospital stay in people with acute COPD. In people with stable COPD, ACTs may lead to short-term improvements in health-related quality of life and a reduced long-term need for hospitalisations related to respiratory issues.

Being either underweight or overweight can affect the symptoms, degree of disability and prognosis of COPD. People with COPD who are underweight can improve their breathing muscle strength by increasing their calorie intake. When combined with regular exercise or a pulmonary rehabilitation program, this can lead to improvements in COPD symptoms. Supplemental nutrition may be useful in those who are malnourished.

Management of exacerbations
People with COPD can experience exacerbations (flare-ups) that are commonly caused by respiratory tract infections. The symptoms that worsen are not specific to COPD and differential diagnoses need to be considered. Acute exacerbations are typically treated by increasing the use of short-acting bronchodilators including a combination of a short-acting inhaled beta agonist and short-acting anticholinergic. These medications can be given either via a metered-dose inhaler with a spacer or via a nebulizer, with both appearing to be equally effective. Nebulization may be easier for those who are more unwell. Oxygen supplementation can be useful. Excessive oxygen; however, can result in increased  levels and a decreased level of consciousness. Corticosteroids given orally can improve lung function and shorten hospital stays but their use is recommended for only five to seven days; longer courses increase the risk of pneumonia and death.

Room temperatures
Maintaining room temperatures of at least 21 °C [70 °F] for a minimum of nine hours a day was associated with better health in those with COPD, especially for smokers. The World Health Organization (WHO) recommends indoor temperatures of a slightly higher range between 18 °C and 24 °C [65 °F and 75 °F].

Room humidity
For people with COPD, the ideal indoor humidity levels are 30-50% RH. Maintaining indoor humidity can be difficult in the winter, especially in cold climates where the heating system is constantly running.

Keeping the indoor relative humidity above 40% RH significantly reduces the infectivity of aerosolized viruses.

Procedures for emphysema

There are a number of procedures to reduce the volume of a lung in cases of severe emphysema with hyperinflation.

Surgical 

For severe emphysema that has proved unresponsive to other therapies lung volume reduction surgery (LVRS) may be an option. LVRS involves the removal of damaged tissue, which improves lung function by allowing the rest of the lungs to expand. It is considered when the emphysema is in the upper lobes and when there are no comorbidities.

Bronchoscopic
 
Minimally invasive bronchoscopic procedures may be carried out to reduce lung volume. These include the use of valves, coils, or thermal ablation. Endobronchial valves are one-way valves that may be used in those with severe hyperinflation resulting from advanced emphysema; a suitable target lobe and no collateral ventilation are required for this procedure. The placement of one or more valves in the lobe induces a partial collapse of the lobe that ensures a reduction in residual volume that improves lung function, the capacity for exercise and quality of life.

The placement of nitinol coils instead of valves is recommended where there is collateral ventilation that would prevent the use of valves. Nitinol is a biocompatible alloy.

Both of these techniques are associated with adverse effects including persistent air leaks and cardiovascular complications. Thermal vapor ablation has an improved profile. Heated water vapor is used to target lobe regions which leads to permanent fibrosis and volume reduction. The procedure is able to target individual lobe segments, can be carried out regardless of collateral ventilation and can be repeated with the natural advance of emphysema.

Other surgeries
In very severe cases lung transplantation might be considered. A CT scan may be useful in surgery considerations. Ventilation/perfusion scintigraphy is another imaging method that may be used to evaluate cases for surgical interventions and also to evaluate post-surgery responses. A bullectomy may be carried out when a giant bulla occupies more than a third of a hemithorax.

Prognosis

COPD is progressive and can lead to premature death. It is estimated that 3% of all disability is related to COPD. The proportion of disability from COPD globally has decreased from 1990 to 2010 due to improved indoor air quality primarily in Asia. The overall number of years lived with disability from COPD, however, has increased.

There are many variables affecting the long-term outcome in COPD and GOLD recommends the use of a composite test (BODE) that includes the main variables of body-mass index, obstruction of airways, dyspnea (breathlessness) and exercise and not just spirometry results.

NICE recommends against the use of BODE for the prognosis assessment in stable COPD; factors such as exacerbations and frailty need to be considered. Other factors that contribute to a poor outcome include older age, comorbidities such as lung cancer and cardiovascular disease and the number and severity of exacerbations needing hospital admittance.

Epidemiology
Estimates of prevalence have considerable variation due to differences in analytical and surveying approach and the choice of diagnostic criteria. An estimated 384 million people aged 30 years or more had COPD in 2010, corresponding to a global prevalence of 12%. The disease affects men and women. The increase in the developing world between 1970 and the 2000s is believed to be related to increasing rates of smoking in this region, an increasing population and an aging population due to fewer deaths from other causes such as infectious diseases. Some developed countries have seen increased rates, some have remained stable and some have seen a decrease in COPD prevalence.

Around three million people die of COPD each year. In some countries, mortality has decreased in men but increased in women. This is most likely due to rates of smoking in women and men becoming more similar. A higher rate of COPD is found in those over 40 years and this increases greatly with advancing age with the highest rate found in those over 60 years. Sex differences in the anatomy of the respiratory system include smaller airway lumens and thicker airway walls in women, which contribute to a greater severity of COPD symptoms like dyspnea and frequency of COPD exacerbation.

In the UK three million people are reported to be affected by COPDtwo million of these being undiagnosed. On average the number of COPD-related deaths between 2007 and 2016 was 28,600. The estimated number of deaths due to occupational exposure was estimated to be about 15% at around 4,000. In the United States in 2018 almost 15.7 million people had been diagnosed with COPD and it is estimated that millions more have not been diagnosed.

In 2011, there were approximately 730,000 hospitalizations in the United States for COPD. Globally COPD in 2019 was the third leading cause of death. In low-income countries COPD does not appear in the top 10 causes of death; in other income groups it is in the top 5.

History

The name chronic obstructive pulmonary disease is believed to have first been used in 1965. Previously it has been known by a number of different names, including chronic obstructive bronchopulmonary disease, chronic airflow obstruction, chronic obstructive lung disease, nonspecific chronic pulmonary disease, diffuse obstructive pulmonary syndrome.

The terms emphysema and chronic bronchitis were formally defined as components of COPD in 1959 at the CIBA guest symposium and in 1962 at the American Thoracic Society Committee meeting on Diagnostic Standards.

Early descriptions of probable emphysema began in 1679 by T. Bonet of a condition of "voluminous lungs" and in 1769 by Giovanni Morgagni of lungs which were "turgid particularly from air". In 1721 the first drawings of emphysema were made by Ruysh. René Laennec, used the term emphysema in his book A Treatise on the Diseases of the Chest and of Mediate Auscultation (1837) to describe lungs that did not collapse when he opened the chest during an autopsy. He noted that they did not collapse as usual because they were full of air and the airways were filled with mucus. In 1842, John Hutchinson invented the spirometer, which allowed the measurement of vital capacity of the lungs. However, his spirometer could only measure volume, not airflow. Tiffeneau and Pinelli in 1947 described the principles of measuring airflow.

Air pollution and the increase in cigarette smoking in Great Britain at the start of the 20th century led to high rates of chronic lung disease, though it received little attention until the Great Smog of London in December 1952. This spurred epidemiological research in the United Kingdom, Holland and elsewhere. In 1953, Dr. George L. Waldbott, an American allergist, first described a new disease he named smoker's respiratory syndrome in the 1953 Journal of the American Medical Association. This was the first association between tobacco smoking and chronic respiratory disease.

Modern treatments were developed during the second half of the 20th century. Evidence supporting the use of steroids in COPD was published in the late 1950s. Bronchodilators came into use in the 1960s following a promising trial of isoprenaline. Further bronchodilators, such as short-acting salbutamol, were developed in the 1970s and the use of long-acting bronchodilators began in the mid-1990s.

Society and culture
It is generally accepted that COPD is widely underdiagnosed and many people remain untreated. In the US the NIH has promoted November as COPD Awareness Month to be an annual focus on increasing awareness of the condition.

Economics
Globally, as of 2010, COPD is estimated to result in economic costs of $2.1 trillion, half of which occurring in the developing world. Of this total an estimated $1.9 trillion are direct costs such as medical care, while $0.2 trillion are indirect costs such as missed work. This is expected to more than double by 2030. In Europe, COPD represents 3% of healthcare spending. In the United States, costs of the disease are estimated at $50 billion, most of which is due to exacerbation. COPD was among the most expensive conditions seen in U.S. hospitals in 2011, with a total cost of about $5.7 billion.

Research

Hyaluronan is a natural sugar in the extracellular matrix that provides a protective coating for cells. It has been shown that on exposure to pollution the hyaluronan in the lungs breaks down into fragments causing irritation and activation of the immune system. There follows subsequent airway constriction and inflammation. The study showed that the inhalation of unfragmented hyaluronan overcame the effects of fragmented HA and reduced inflammation. Inhaled HA only acts locally in the bronchial tree and does not interfere with any drug. It improves mucus clearance by allowing it to move more freely. Further studies are to be carried out in the 
US to determine optimum dosage levels.

A new cryogenic treatment aimed at the chronic bronchitic subtype using a liquid nitrogen metered cryospray is being trialled and was due to complete in September 2021.

Stem-cell therapy using mesenchymal stem cells has the potential to restore lung function and thereby improve quality of life. In June 2021 eight clinical trials had been completed and seventeen were underway. Overall, stem cell therapy has proved to be safe. The trials include the use of stem cells from different sources such as adipose tissue, bone marrow and umbilical cord blood.

A procedure known as targeted lung denervation is being trialled and has been used as part of a clinical trial (2021) in a hospital in the UK. The new minimally invasive procedure which takes about an hour to carry out, places electrodes to destroy branches of the vagus nerve in the lungs. The vagus nerve is responsible for both muscle contraction and mucus secretion, which results in narrowing the airways. In those with COPD these nerves are overactive, usually as a result of smoking damage and the constant mucus secretion and airway constriction leads to the symptoms of cough, shortness of breath, wheeze and tightness of the chest.

The effectiveness of alpha-1 antitrypsin augmentation treatment for people who have alpha-1 antitrypsin deficiency is unclear. A later clinical trial of double-dosing has shown some improvements in slowing the breakdown of elastin and the progression of emphysema with further studies being called for.

Mass spectrometry is being studied as a diagnostic tool in COPD.

Research continues into the use of telehealthcare to treat people with COPD when they experience episodes of shortness of breath; treating people remotely may reduce the number of emergency-room visits and improve the person's quality of life.

Evidence is growing for the effectiveness of Astaxanthin against lung disease including COPD. Astaxanthin is a potent antioxidant with anti-inflammatory properties and more trials are said to be needed into its use.

American COPD patients and their caregivers consider the following COPD-related research areas as the most important: family/social/community research, patients' well‐being, curative research, biomedical therapies, policy and holistic therapies.

Other animals
Chronic obstructive pulmonary disease may occur in a number of other animals and may be caused by exposure to tobacco smoke. Most cases of the disease, however, are relatively mild. In horses it is known as recurrent airway obstruction (RAO) or heaves. RAO can be quite severe and most often is linked to exposure to common allergens. COPD is also commonly found in old dogs.

See also
 	
Extracorporeal membrane oxygenation
Dahl's sign

References

Works cited

External links 

 

Aging-associated diseases
Chronic lower respiratory diseases
Health effects of tobacco
Occupational diseases
Wikipedia emergency medicine articles ready to translate
Wikipedia medicine articles ready to translate (full)
Occupational safety and health